Queso blanco, literally white cheese in Spanish, can refer to many different kinds of cheeses whose only common trait is their white color. The specific cheese referred to depends on the region.

Production 

Queso blanco is considered an easy cheese to make, as it requires no careful handling and does not call for rennet or bacterial culture. It is usually made by heating whole fresh milk to near-boiling, adding an acidifying agent such as vinegar, stirring until curds form, then draining the curds in cheesecloth for three to five hours. Such cheeses are also known as "bag cheeses," as the curds are normally hung in a bag of cheesecloth to drain. Many Mexican home cooks make their own instead of purchasing it; when made for the evening meal, it is often prepared in the early afternoon and left to drain until evening. As it is highly perishable, it must be refrigerated or used immediately once the whey has drained out.

Common uses 
Queso blanco and queso fresco may be eaten alone or added to other dishes. They are often used as a topping for spicy Mexican dishes such as enchiladas and empanadas or crumbled over soups or salads. Meltable versions are used to make quesadillas. It is used to make cheesecake in some parts of the world. In Peruvian cuisine, several recipes mix queso fresco and spices to make a spicy cold sauce eaten over peeled boiled potatoes, such as papa a la Huancaína or ocopa.

Regional varieties

Mexico 

In Mexican cuisine, queso blanco is traditionally made from cow's milk, whereas queso fresco may be made from a combination of cow's and goat's milk. Some versions of these cheeses, such as Oaxaca cheese, melt well when heated, but most only soften. If it is pressed, and more water is removed, it becomes known as queso seco.

Brazil

Dominican Republic 
In Dominican Republic cuisine queso blanco is a firm, salty cheese used for frying: queso frito.

Nicaragua 
In Nicaraguan cuisine, queso blanco is a firm cheese used for frying: queso frito.

Philippines
In Philippine cuisine, kesong puti is made from water buffalo's milk.

Portugal
In Portuguese cuisine,  refers to a popular mild, soft, creamy, white unaged cheese used throughout the Iberian Peninsula. In the Azores queijo fresco is typically served with the fresh pepper sauce pimenta de terra.

Puerto Rico 
In Puerto Rican cuisine, queso blanco is a firm cheese used for frying and typically paired with guava paste. The cheese also goes by queso fresco and queso blanco del país. Although still popular, it has been losing consumers due to higher-quality cheese becoming available on the island.

Venezuela 
Venezuelan cuisine has a large diversity of white cheese (quesos blancos), varying in texture and flavor, usually named after a geographical region.

Similar cheeses 
The following cheese names may refer to queso blanco in the Spanish-speaking world or be considered similar to any of its local varieties.

 asadero
 halloumi
 Indian paneer
 farmer cheese
 pot cheese
 quark (or tvorog) from Central and Eastern Europe

References 

Acid-set cheeses
Brazilian cheeses
Mexican cheeses
Cow's-milk cheeses
Portuguese cheeses
Spanish cheeses